Carl Frølich Hanssen (8 January 1883 – 6 January 1960) was a Norwegian military officer and sports executive. He was head of the Norwegian Nazi Labour Service during the Second World War. He born in Fredrikshald (Halden).

Before the Second World War he had a military career in the field artillery, eventually with the rank of colonel. During the German occupation of Norway he was head of the Norwegian Nazi Labour Service. In the legal purge in Norway after World War II he was sentenced to seven years imprisonment.

He won the Norwegian Football Cup with the club Mercantile in 1907 and 1912. He also represented the Norway national team on one occasion in 1910. He served as president of the Football Association of Norway for two periods, 1907–1908 and 1911–1912.

References

1883 births
1960 deaths
People from Halden
Norwegian footballers
Norwegian sports executives and administrators
Norwegian Army personnel of World War II
Members of Nasjonal Samling
People convicted of treason for Nazi Germany against Norway
Association football forwards
Norway international footballers